Domestic Digital Bus, D2B, is an isochronous ring-based fibreoptical communications technology, with a bandwidth of 12 Mbit/s, specified by the Optical Chip Consortium for use in automotive applications. As of 2007, D2B is used by Mercedes-Benz in their vehicles.

External links 
 Official IEC Standard
 Mercedes-Benz technical overview of D2B
 D2B equipment manufacturer's technical overview of D2B
 Overview of this and similar technologies in The Engineer magazine

Automotive electronics